Boronia fastigiata, commonly known as bushy boronia, is a plant in the citrus family, Rutaceae and is endemic to the south-west of Western Australia. It is an erect shrub with small leaves and small groups of red, pink or purple, four-petalled flowers near the ends of the branches.

Description
The flowers are red, pink or purple and are arranged singly or in small groups in upper leaf axils. The eight stamens are hairy. Flowering mostly occurs from September to December.

Taxonomy and naming
Boronia fastigiata was first formally described in 1845 by Friedrich Gottlieb Bartling and the description was published in Plantae Preissianae. The specific epithet (fastigiata) is derived from the Latin word fastigium meaning "top of a gable" or "ridge of a roof".

Distribution and habitat
Boronia fastigiata grows on flats and hillside, often near streams and occurs between Perth, Albany and Collie  in the Jarrah Forest, Swan Coastal Plain and Warren biogeographic regions of Western Australia.

Conservation
Boronia fastigiata is classified as "not threatened" by the Western Australian Government Department of Parks and Wildlife.

References

fastigiata
Flora of Western Australia
Plants described in 1845
Taxa named by Friedrich Gottlieb Bartling